Russian Goal (Russian: Русская Цель) is a militant far-right organization in Russia, at one time led by Semyon Tokmakov. The group achieved international notoriety in 1999 when its members, led by Tokmakov, attacked William Jefferson, a black United States Marine embassy guard. Tokmakov was arrested for the attack, but amnestied after receiving a short jail sentence.

References

External links
Russia, Fascists, Pogroms, Violence
Nazi skinheads in modern Russia Youth Human Rights Group, Karelia, Russia. 18 Nov 2005.

Russian nationalist organizations
Paramilitary organizations based in Russia
Far-right politics in Russia